The UCI Continental Circuits are a series of road bicycle racing competitions which were introduced in 2005 by the Union Cycliste Internationale (UCI) to expand cycling around the world. The five circuits (representing the continents of Africa, the Americas, Asia, Europe and Oceania) are ranked below the UCI World Tour and, as of 2020, the UCI ProSeries.

UCI Africa Tour

Winners
There is a rolling ranking for individuals and countries (the total of the top 8 ranked riders of the nation), for which points can be won in all UCI road events, regardless of where the races take place.  Prior to 2019 there was also a team ranking, and in all three categories points were earned in continental races of category HC or below (1.1 and 2.1 or below from 2020) that took place in Africa, regardless of the nationality of the rider.

UCI America Tour

Winners
There is a rolling ranking for individuals and countries (the total of the top 8 ranked riders of the nation), for which points can be won in all UCI road events, regardless of where the races take place.  Prior to 2019 there was also a team ranking, and in all three categories points were earned in continental races of category HC or below (1.1 and 2.1 or below from 2020) that took place in the Americas, regardless of the nationality of the rider.

UCI Asia Tour

Winners
There is a rolling ranking for individuals and countries (the total of the top 8 ranked riders of the nation), for which points can be won in all UCI road events, regardless of where the races take place.  Prior to 2019 there was also a team ranking, and in all three categories points were earned in continental races of category HC or below (1.1 and 2.1 or below from 2020) that took place in Asia, regardless of the nationality of the rider.

UCI Europe Tour

Winners
There is a rolling ranking for individuals and countries (the total of the top 8 ranked riders of the nation), for which points can be won in all UCI road events, regardless of where the races take place.  Prior to 2019 there was also a team ranking, and in all three categories points were earned in continental races of category HC (1.1 and 2.1 or below from 2020) or below that took place in Europe, regardless of the nationality of the rider.

UCI Oceania Tour

Winners
There is a rolling ranking for individuals and countries (the total of the top 8 ranked riders of the nation), for which points can be won in all UCI road events, regardless of where the races take place.  Prior to 2019 there was also a team ranking, and in all three categories points were earned in continental races of category HC or below (1.1 and 2.1 or below from 2020) that took place in Oceania, regardless of the nationality of the rider.

References

External links
 UCI Africa Tour
 UCI America Tour
 UCI Asia Tour
 UCI Europe Tour
 UCI Oceania Tour

 
Continental Circuits
Men's road cycling
Recurring sporting events established in 2005